Piera Macchi (born 5 March 1959) is a former Italian World Cup alpine ski racer who competed in one edition (1982) of the FIS Alpine World Ski Championships.

Career
Between 1979 and 1982 he collected twelve top 10 placings in the World Cup.

World Championships results

References

External links
 

1959 births
Living people
Italian female alpine skiers